Bellew is a surname of Irish origin. The name may refer to:
Cosmo Kyrle Bellew (1874–1948), British/American film actor
Edward Donald Bellew (1882–1961), Canadian recipient of the Victoria Cross for action in WWI
Francie Bellew (born 1976), Irish Gaelic footballer
Frank Bellew (1828–1888), American artist; created the iconic image of Uncle Sam
George Bellew (1899–1993), British army officer, genealogist, and armorer
Henry Walter Bellew (1834–1892), Indian-born British medical officer and author
Jack Bellew (1901–1957), Australian journalist and publisher
Kyrle Bellew (1850–1911), British stage actor
Ray Bellew (1939–2006), Canadian actor
Richard Bellew, or Richard Bellewe, (fl. 1575–1585), legal reporter
Richard Bellew (1803–1880), Irish politician
Thomas Bellew (Galway politician) (1820–1863), Irish landowner and politician from Mountbellew
Thomas Bellew (Louth politician) (1943–1995), Irish politician from Louth
Tom Bellew (1922–2001) Australian Rugby League administrator
Tony Bellew (born 1982), British professional boxer
Peter Bellew (born 1965) CEO Malaysia Airlines

Irish peerage
Baron Bellew, any of several barons in the peerage of Ireland
Baron Bellew of Duleek, a previous baronetcy of Ireland; created 1686, extinct 1770
Grattan-Bellew Baronets, baronetcy in Mount Bellew, County Galway, Ireland